Schaaf Creek is a stream in Cooper and Moniteau counties of central Missouri.

References

Rivers of Cooper County, Missouri
Rivers of Moniteau County, Missouri
Rivers of Missouri